Miss Kyrgyzstan is a national beauty pageant in Kyrgyzstan. The pageant was founded in 2009, where the winners were sent to Miss Universe.

History 

In 2011 Directorate of the National Competition, Interalliance KG LLC, organized the contest Miss Kyrgyzstan 2011 with support of Ministry of Culture and Information of Kyrgyz Republic, at the theater of opera and ballet, Bishkek, March 12, 2011. The competition consisted of several stages: cocktail dress, bikini, talent, interview, and evening dress.

Deputy Minister of Culture and Information of Kyrgyz Republic, Mr. Kuluev was invited to award the certificate of Miss Kyrgyzstan title and crown Miss Kyrgyzstan 2011 at the stage. The competition was won by a 24-year-old resident of Bishkek, Nurzhanova Nazira. She was the first delegate from Kyrgyzstan to Miss World. Asel Samakova was chosen to represent Kyrgyzstan in Miss International 2011.

In 2012 Directorate of the National Competition Interalliance KG LLC organized the beauty contest Miss Kyrgyzstan 2012. From March 25 to April 26, the contest was held with a long program of charity. After the preliminary rounds, 26 girls from different regions of Kyrgyzstan took part in the finals. The finals of the competition consisted of four stages: out in cocktail dresses / acquaintance, access to the national costume / dance, out in a bikini, out in evening dresses / intelligent response to questions. The title went to  Diana Ovganova. Runner-up was Mukambetova Bermet. Because of personal reasons, Diana Ovganova couldn't participate in Miss World 2012.

In 2013 under the program of "Beauty with a Purpose" on 9 May, all the participants took part in a charity event. Participants of the beauty contest Miss Kyrgyzstan 2013 visited a Bishkek home for old people. The girls congratulated all the grandparents in a boarding house on Victory Day. They were treated to sweets and presented gifts from the organizers of Miss Kyrgyzstan 2013. 

The final was held on May 12, 2013. Miss Kyrgyzstan 2013 was Zhibek Nukeeva, and she participated in Miss World 2013. First runner-up Meerim Erkinbaeva represented her country in Miss International 2013.

In September 2014, Miss Kyrgyzstan 2014 was organized and 20 contestants from every region of Kyrgyzstan were represented.  Miss Kyrgyzstan 2014 was Aykol Alikzhanova, who was 24 years old. She represented her country in Miss World 2014 in London. Earlier Aykol Alikzhanova participated in 
Miss Kyrgyzstan 2011. The first runner-up was Tattububu Ergeshbaeva. Aikol has participated in Miss World 2014 but she did not qualify in top 20. 

On July 21, Miss Kyrgyzstan 2015 was organized in Saltanat Palace jointly by Interalliance KG LLC and R-Style. 18 contestants took part. The results were: Miss Kyrgyzstan 2015 – Tattybubu Samidin Kyzy, she represented the country in Miss World 2015, the first runner-up was Dayana Kendzhebaeva. Tattybubu Samidin kyzy have participated in Miss World 2015 in Sanya, China, she did not qualify in top 20. 

In 2016, Miss Kyrgyzstan was organized by Interalliance KG LLC in Mansion music hall on May 21, 2016. 15 contestants took part. The title of Miss Kyrgyzstan – 2016 have got by 18-year-old Rasulbek-Kyzy Perizat. She represented the country in Miss World 2016. but she did not qualify in the top 20.
 
In 2017, Miss Kyrgyzstan was organized by Interalliance KG LLC and the title of Miss Kyrgyzstan – 2017 have got by Begimay Karybekova. She represented the country in Miss Universe 2018.

In 2018, the event Miss Kyrgyzstan 2018 was organized with the support of the Ministry of Culture, Information and Tourism of Kyrgyzstan. 25 contestants from different regions of the republic competed for the title of the most beautiful Kyrgyz woman. According to the results of all the performances, the jury recognized Elmar Buranbaeva, representing Jalal-Abad region, as the winner. The girl is 21 years old, she is studying to be a philologist.

In 2019, 21-year-old Aizhan Chanacheva won the title of "Miss Kyrgyzstan - 2019", the final of the competition took place on October 12, in Bishkek at the Sheraton hotel. The winner was put on a crown of gold and silver, which is decorated with six rubies.

In 2020, Miss Kyrgyzstan title had gone to Ms. Lazat Nurkozhoeva. The Miss Kyrgyzstan 2020 was organized by Interalliance KG jointly with R-Style - Beauty Company of Kyrgyzstan, the event took place at the Ala-Too Hall on December 29. As a prize, Nurkozhoeva received a BMW X5 car.

Miss Kyrgyzstan - 2021 was held on September 30th, and in total, 31 contestants competed for the title. The title "Miss Kyrgyzstan" was won by 17-year-old Altynai Botoyarova. The competition was organized by R-Style agency and held in several stages: a fashion show in national costumes, a presentation of the participants, a creative stage, a fashion show in evening dresses.

Titleholders 
The following is a list of winners for International pageants. From 2011 to present..

Representatives to international beauty pageants

Miss Universe Kyrgyzstan

Miss World Kyrgyzstan

Miss International Kyrgyzstan

Miss Earth Kyrgyzstan

Miss Supranational Kyrgyzstan

Miss Grand Kyrgyzstan

Miss Intercontinental Kyrgyzstan

References

External links 
 
 Official website of organizer

Beauty pageants in Kyrgyzstan
Kyrgyzstan
Recurring events established in 2009